Suicide crisis lines can be found in many countries worldwide. Many are geared to a general audience while others are specific to a select demographic such as LGBTQIA+ youth, Native American and Aboriginal Canadian youth. There have been studies in the United States and Australia which show that suicide crisis lines may help people who feel like killing or hurting themselves and may make them feel better.

One of the first suicide crisis lines was the Samaritans, founded in the United Kingdom in 1953 by Chad Varah, the then Rector of the former St. Stephen's Church in London. He decided to start a "listening service" after reading a sermon at the grave of a 13-year-old girl who had committed suicide. She was in distress prior to her death and had no one to talk to.

Crisis lines by country

Notes

References

Suicide prevention
Suicide
Crisis hotlines
Suicide-related lists
fr:Prévention du suicide#Écoute en ligne et aide directe